The Scarlet Letter (stylized The SCARlet Letter) is the fifth studio album by American recording artist Lil' Mo. It was first released on October 27, 2014 by Penalty Entertainment. Its first and only single, "Should've Never Let You Go" preceded its release on September 23, 2014.

Background 
In 2013, Mo became a cast member of TV One reality show R&B Divas: Los Angeles alongside Chanté Moore, Kelly Price, Claudette Ortiz (of City High), Michel'le and Dawn Robinson. The series premiered in July 2013. The premiere of a reunion special to R&B Divas: LA built on TV One's historic summer ratings success, attaining a total of 834,000 viewers. Additionally, the special's ratings tied with the debut of the original sitcom The Rickey Smiley Show as the network's No. 1 telecast among adults 25–54 in TV One history.

On September 10, 2013, Lil' Mo released the song "I'm a Diva" via iTunes. Another song titled "L's Up" was released the following week. In April 2014, as part of preparation for her fifth album, The Scarlet Letter, Lil' Mo released her second mixtape No Shit Sherlock, which featured contributions by Da Brat and songwriter Tiyon "TC" Mack. On August 20, Lil' Mo announced via Twitter that The SCARlet Letter would be released on October 28, 2014.

Track listing

Credits and personnel 
Credits for The Scarlet Letter adapted from Allmusic.

 Jason Acuna - Mixing
 Adam "Streets" Arnwine - Composer
 Craig Brockman - Producer
 C. Chavez - Composer
 Hoza Clowney - Composer, Producer
 D. Cooper - Composer
 Winfred Crabtree II - Producer
 Keenan Ephriam - Producer
 Garrick Smit - Producer
 Doug Gelkie - Mixing
 Lil' Mo - Primary Artist
 C. Loving - Composer
 Ryan Marrone - Producer
 Nigel McIntosh - Mixing
 Jarius Mozee - Additional Production, Producer
 Mumen "Mookie" Ngenge - Vocals, Vocals (Background)
 Gabriel Roland - Producer
 Tavin Sparrow - Composer, Producer
 Josh "JD" Thomas - Mixing, Producer
 David Walker - Composer, Producer

References 

2014 albums
Lil' Mo albums